USS Frazier (DD-607) was a Benson-class destroyer in the United States Navy during World War II.

Namesake
Daniel Frazier was born ca. 1785 in Dorchester County, Maryland. He joined the Navy as a seaman in 1802. Serving in the Mediterranean Sea during the First Barbary War, he took part in Stephen Decatur's renowned foray into Tripoli harbor to destroy the captured  and was again with Decatur in the attack on Tripoli on 3 August 1804. He was severely wounded in the gunboat attack, and is believed by many historians to have received these wounds while protecting Decatur with his own body. This act of bravery is commonly attributed (incorrectly) to another sailor, Reuben James, due to an image with a tattoo displaying the name James. He died in New York City about 22 April 1833.

Construction and commissioning
Frazier was launched 17 March 1942 by Bethlehem Steel Corporation, San Francisco, California; sponsored by Mrs. Richard McCullough; and commissioned 30 July 1942, Lieutenant Commander Frank Virden in command.

1942 and 1943

Frazier arrived at Noumea, New Caledonia, 9 December 1942 in the escort for a group of troop transports. She served on escort and patrol in the South Pacific for the next 4 months, guarding transports to Guadalcanal, patrolling off Espiritu Santo, and covering escort carriers as they patrolled the waters between Efate and the Solomon Islands. On 18 March 1943, Frazier departed Efate bound for Pearl Harbor and a rendezvous with a task force assigned to operate in the Aleutian Islands.

After firing in the preinvasion bombardment, Frazier covered the landings on Attu 11 May 1943, and patrolled off that island and Kiska, Alaska. On 12 May, she sighted two periscopes and opened gunfire on  who dived quickly but not before Frazier had scored hits on the periscopes. Immediately gaining sonar contact, the destroyer began a depth charge attack which brought air bubbles, oil, and debris to the surface. Two more attacks ensured the submarine was sunk.

Early in the foggy morning of 10 June, with Lieutenant Commander Elliot M. Brown in command, she made two separate attacks on radar contacts which were believed to be submarines. In the second attack, the destroyer's guns fired for five minutes as she pursued her target until its radar echo merged with land echo of Kiska. Late that night and again on the morning of 11 June, Frazier dropped depth charges on two different underwater contacts, but was unable to determine the results of these attacks; it is likely she sank I-9 in one of them.

On 2 and 12 August, she fired shore bombardment on Kiska, then covered the unopposed landings of 15 August. She continued to screen large combatants in the Aleutians until early September, when she began a brief overhaul at Puget Sound.

Frazier sailed to Wellington, New Zealand, to join the escort for transports assigned to the Gilbert Islands operation. Between 7 and 13 November 1943 the group rehearsed at Efate, then sailed on to Tarawa, where Frazier provided preassault bombardment and call-fire support to the troops landed 20 November. Patrolling off Betio, on 22 November, Frazier joined  in attacking . After the two destroyers had depth-charged I-35 to the surface, they attacked it with gunfire, and Frazier finally sent her to the bottom by ramming. Her bow was badly damaged, but none of her men was injured. Two days later, she sailed for repairs and training at Pearl Harbor.

1944

Frazier sortied from Pearl Harbor 22 January 1944 for the invasion of the Marshall Islands. She bombarded Taroa and Maloelap on 30 January, and next screened  as the cruiser bombarded targets on Kwajalein, while the landings were made. After patrolling against submarines off Kwajalein, Frazier returned to Pearl Harbor 15 February screening unladen transports. Between 28 February and 20 March, the destroyer carried out escort and patrol assignments in the Marshalls, then joined the fast carrier task force to screen during the air raids on the Palaus, Yap, Ulithi, and Woleai from 30 March to 1 April.

Returning to Majuro 6 April 1944, Frazier sailed a week later with a fast carrier task group for attacks on Wakde Airfield and Sawar Airfield in Western New Guinea, on 21 and 22 April, to neutralize the danger of air attack on the Landing at Aitape and the Battle of Hollandia. The task group also struck at targets in the Caroline Islands as it sailed back to arrive at Kwajalein 4 May. From 10 May to 27 July, Frazier patrolled the bypassed Japanese-held islands in the Marshalls, which included Wotje, Jaluit, and Mille. She bombarded Mille on 26 May, and on 9 June sent her motor whale-boat in under the guns of Taroa to rescue 10 survivors of a flying boat previously sent in to rescue a downed aviator and were stranded when their plane was damaged by a shore battery. Two weeks later she rescued two Marine aviators off Mille.

A west coast overhaul and training at Pearl Harbor preceded Frazier'''s assignment to escort duty out of Ulithi between 15 December 1944 and the close of the year. On 6 January 1945, the destroyer arrived in San Pedro Bay, from which she sailed the next day for the invasion of Lingayen Gulf. From the day of the landings, 9 January, until 26 February, Frazier carried out bombardment, gunfire support, patrol, and escort missions all around Luzon, taking part in the bombardment of Corregidor on 16 February. After replenishing at San Pedro Bay, Frazier returned to escort and fire support duties in the Manila area, covered the landings at Mindanao in mid-March, and patrolled against submarines between Lingayen Gulf and Subic Bay on 10 May.

1945, end of World War II and fate

Sailing from San Pedro Bay 13 May 1945, Frazier arrived at Morotai 2 days later, and based here for the Borneo operation. She took part in the invasions of Brunei Bay and Balikpapan, and escorted support convoys to the assault areas until returning to Subic Bay 29 July for training.

Assigned to the Philippine Sea Frontier for escort duty at the close of the war, she made voyages to Okinawa and Japan until 3 November, when she sailed for Boston, Massachusetts and Charleston, South Carolina. There Frazier was decommissioned and placed in reserve 15 April 1946. She was stricken from the Naval Vessel Register on 1 July 1971 and sold for scrap on 6 October 1972.

AwardsFrazier received 12 battle stars for World War II service.

As of 2009, no other ship in the United States Navy has been named Frazier.

Notes

References
 Fitzsimons, Bernard, ed. Encyclopedia of 20th Century Weapons and Warfare, Vol. 3, p.315, "Benson". London: Phoebus, 1978.
 Lenton, H. T. American Fleet and Escort Destroyers, Vol.1. Doubleday, 1973.
 Stille, Mark. Imperial Japanese Navy Submarines 1941-45''. Osprey, 2007.

Benson-class destroyers
Ships built in San Francisco
1942 ships
World War II destroyers of the United States
Ships of the Aleutian Islands campaign